The Committee of Public Accounts is a select committee of the British House of Commons. It is responsible for overseeing government expenditures, and to ensure they are effective and honest. The committee is seen as a crucial mechanism for ensuring transparency and accountability in government financial operations, having been described by Professor the Lord Hennessy as "the queen of the select committees...[which] by its very existence exert[s] a cleansing effect in all government departments".

Overview
The recommendation for the creation of a committee to oversee government accounts was first put forward in 1857 by a small group of interested Members of Parliament led by Sir Francis Baring. The structure and function of the PAC date back to reforms initiated by William Ewart Gladstone, when he was British Chancellor of the Exchequer in the 1860s. The first Public Accounts Committee was established in 1862 by a resolution of the British House of Commons:

There shall be a standing committee designated "The Committee of Public Accounts"; for the examination of the Accounts showing the appropriation of sums granted by Parliament to meet the Public Expenditure, to consist of nine members, who shall be nominated at the commencement of every Session, and of whom five shall be a quorum.

The form has since been replicated in virtually all Commonwealth of Nations and many non-Commonwealth countries. A minister from His Majesty's Treasury sits on the committee but, by convention, does not attend hearings. The Chair of the committee is always drawn from the main opposition party and is usually a former senior Minister.

The Exchequer and Audit Departments Act 1866 appointed The Committee of Public Accounts to oversee the work of the Comptroller and Auditor General (C&AG)<ref>National Audit Office History of the National Audit Office, Accessed 25 September 2012</ref> The Committee continues to be assisted by the C&AG who is a permanent witness at its hearings, along with his staff of the National Audit Office, who provide briefings on each report and assist in the preparation of the Committee's own reports.

Notable reports
The Public Accounts Committee has criticised numerous aspects of government spending over the years, including:
in 2009, the committee highlighted problems with contractor delivery on service contracts such as the marking of SATS tests and the payment of Education Maintenance Allowances, which was then payable in England as well as in the devolved nations. The committee noted that government departments were not paying sufficient attention to contract management tasks.
 reductions in funding for local authorities, described in 2010 as leaving many of them "in a worrying financial position"
the NHS National Programme for IT, which was described in 2013 as one of the worst fiascos ever in the history of public sector contracts
 the decommissioning of the Sellafield nuclear reprocessing site, noting in 2013 that the cost had reached £67.5 billion, and there was "no indication of when that cost will stop rising"
the "unimaginable" amount spent on the outsourced system for COVID-19 testing and contact tracing up to March 2021, with no clear evidence of overall effectiveness

Membership
The Committee's members as of October 2022 are as follows:v

Changes since 2019

2017-2019 Parliament
The chair was elected on 12 July 2017, with members being announced on 11 September 2017.

Changes 2017-2019

2015-2017 Parliament
The chair was elected on 18 June 2015, with members being announced on 7 July 2015.

Changes 2015-2017

2010-2015 Parliament
The chair was elected on 10 June 2010, with members being announced on 12 July 2010.

Changes 2010-2015

Chairs (1861–present)
House of Commons standing orders give the party of the official Opposition the right to chair the committee.

See also
List of Committees of the United Kingdom Parliament

References

Further reading
 David McGee, The Overseers – Public Accounts Committees and Public Spending, Pluto Press, London 2002.
 Stapenhurst, Rick; Sahgal, Vinod; Woodley, William; Pelizzo, Riccardo; World Bank'', 1 May 2005, Policy Research Working Paper WPS3613,  Scrutinizing public expenditures: assessing the performance of public accounts committees
 Pelizzo, Riccardo, Stapenhurst, Rick, Saghal, Vinod and William Woodley, What Makes Public Accounts Committees Work?, Politics and Policy, vol. 34, n. 4, December 2006. pp. 774–793.
 Riccardo Pelizzo and Rick Stapenhurst, Strengthening Public Accounts Committees by Targeting Regional and Country Specific Weaknesses, in Anwar Shah (ed.), Performance Accountability and Combating Corruption, Washington DC, The World Bank, 2007, pp. 379–393.
 Jacobs, K. 1997. ‘A reforming accountability’, International Journal of Health Planning and Management 12: 169–85.
 Jacobs, K.1998. ‘Value for money auditing in New Zealand: competing for control in the public sector’, British Accounting Review 30: 343–360
 Jones, C. 1987. ‘The Origins of the Victorian Parliamentary Public Accounts Committee’, MA, University of Melbourne.

External links
 Public Accounts Committee homepage
 Records for this Committee are held at the Parliamentary Archives

Westminster system
Select Committees of the British House of Commons
1861 establishments in the United Kingdom
UK